The men's 4 x 100 metres relay at the 2011 Asian Athletics Championships was held at the Kobe Universiade Memorial Stadium on the 8 and 10 of July.

Medalists

Records

Results

Round 1
First 3 in each heat (Q) and 2 best performers (q) advanced to the Final.

Final

References

Relays 4x100
Relays at the Asian Athletics Championships